The Business of Love is a 1925 American silent comedy film directed by Irving Reis and Jess Robbins and starring Edward Everett Horton, Barbara Bedford, and Zasu Pitts.

Plot
As described in a film magazine review, a young man educated for the law derives so much more pleasure from tinkering with clocks and radios that he falls from his rich uncle’s graces. On one of his repairing exDeditions he meets and is attracted to the daughter of an inventor. When he learns that the man selected by his uncle as the other member of the law firm of which he presumably is a member, is plotting to swindle the inventor, he schemes against the schemer. Finally, he is successful both in breaking the plot and in wooing the inventor’s daughter.

Cast

References

Bibliography
 Munden, Kenneth White. The American Film Institute Catalog of Motion Pictures Produced in the United States, Part 1. University of California Press, 1997.

External links
 

1925 films
1926 comedy films
1926 films
1920s English-language films
American silent feature films
Silent American comedy films
American black-and-white films
Films directed by Jess Robbins
Films directed by Irving Reis
1925 comedy films
1920s American films